Lixa is a Portuguese city in Felgueiras Municipality, with 4,233 inhabitants in 2001. It has four parishes, Vila Cova da Lixa, Santão, Borba de Godim and Macieira da Lixa, that adds 12,58 km² in area.

Parishes
 Vila Cova da Lixa
 Santão
 Borba de Godim
 Macieira da Lixa

References

Lixa